Schistura horai is a species of ray-finned fish in the stone loach genus Schistura. It is found in India and Pakistan. It is named in honour of the ichthyologist Sunder Lal Hora (1896-1955), who was the Director of the Zoological Survey of India and who collected the type specimen in 1926 in Himachal Pradesh.

References 

H
Fish described in 1952